Kondoraphe is a genus of tropical land snails with gills and an operculum, terrestrial gastropod mollusks in the family Neocyclotidae.

Species
Species within the genus Kondoraphe include:
 Kondoraphe kiyokoae

References

Neocyclotidae
Taxonomy articles created by Polbot